Prosimnia is a genus of sea snails, marine gastropod mollusks in the subfamily Eocypraeinae of the family Ovulidae.

Species
Species within the genus Prosimnia include:
 † Prosimnia blackae Beu & B. A. Marshall, 2011 
Prosimnia boshuensis Cate, 1973
Prosimnia draconis Cate, 1973
 Prosimnia hepcae Lorenz & Fehse, 2011
Prosimnia korkosi Fehse, 2005
Prosimnia semperi (Weinkauff, 1881)
Synonyms
 Prosimnia piriei (Petuch, 1973): synonym of Amonovula piriei (Petuch, 1973)
 Prosimnia renovata Iredale, 1930: synonym of Crenavolva renovata (Iredale, 1930)
 Prosimnia verconis Cotton & Godfrey, 1932: synonym of Crenavolva verconis (Cotton & Godfrey, 1932) (original combination)

References

Ovulidae